Lục súc tranh công (六畜爭功 "The Quarrel of the Six Beasts") is a classic narrative poem written in late Eighteenth Century Vietnam. Although the title is given in classical chu Han the poem itself is written in the vernacular Vietnamese language in Sino-Vietnamese nôm script and luc bat verse. The poem is anonymous. It is set in the tuồng form of traditional drama.

References

External links
 Wikisource súc tranh công

Vietnamese poems